Walt Disney Treasures is a series of two-disc DVD collections of Disney cartoons, television episodes and other material. They cover material from the studio's earliest days to its more recent work. There were nine waves, each containing two to four sets, for a total of 30 titles. All content is presented uncensored and uncut with digitally restored picture and remastered sound (except where noted on individual titles).

The first wave was released to Region 1 DVD on December 4, 2001, as a part of Walt Disney's 100th birthday. They were sold in limited quantities. The numbered units are largely commercially unavailable. Only a handful of these titles have been sold outside Region 1.

Most of the sets are available in Europe as Region 2 except The Mickey Mouse Club Presents: Annette; The Complete First and Second Seasons of Zorro; Dr. Syn: The Scarecrow of Romney Marsh; The Chronological Donald Volume Four; Disneyland: Secrets; Stories and Magic; Your Host, Walt Disney; The Complete Pluto Volume Two; Elfego Baca and the Swamp Fox; The Hardy Boys: The Mystery of the Applegate Treasure; The Adventures of Spin & Marty (The Mickey Mouse Club); More Silly Symphonies; Disney Rarities: Celebrated Shorts: 1920s–1960s; Davy Crockett; Tomorrowland; Disneyland U.S.A and On the Front Lines.

In Japan, more of the sets were produced for the Japanese market in Region 2, along with sets that are available in Europe: The Chronological Donald Volume Four, The Complete Pluto Volume Two, Disney Rarities: Celebrated Shorts: 1920s–1960s, Disneyland: Secrets, Stories and Magic and More Silly Symphonies.

In Brazil, only five Walt Disney Treasures sets have been released: the two Mickey Mouse in Living Color volumes, Silly Symphonies, The Chronological Donald, Volume One, and The Adventures of Oswald the Lucky Rabbit, with those releases (with the exception of Oswald) also being released in Mexico.

"The Runaway Brain" Mickey Mouse cartoon is available on the Walt Disney Treasures Mickey Mouse in Living Color: Volume 2 sets in France, Brazil, Mexico and Japan. These are the only internationally released sets featuring the cartoon.

Each title has been packaged in a numbered tin case. The first two waves featured numbers stamped into each case, while subsequent waves contained certificates of authenticity marking their numbers. The first three waves were bound in a cardboard sleeve displaying the reproduced signatures of Leonard Maltin and Roy Disney. In 2003, a Costco-exclusive boxed set called The Ultimate Disney Treasure Chest presented the first two waves of the series without the tin canisters, later, in 2009, the D23 released the Walt Disney Treasures Premium Collection, a limited edition near-complete collection of all the releases in the series with the exception of the Elfego Baca and The Swamp Fox: Legendary Heroes set and the two Wave Nine releases.

The DVD sets were the idea of film critic/historian Leonard Maltin, who appears in each set to introduce the DVDs and to provide historical context to some of the more dated works. These introductions would sometimes alert viewers of politically incorrect content, similar to Whoopi Goldberg's introductions for the Looney Tunes Golden Collection.

Release history

Walt Disney Treasures: Wave One — December 4, 2001
 Mickey Mouse in Living Color
 Silly Symphonies
 Disneyland, USA
 Davy Crockett
Walt Disney Treasures: Wave Two — December 3, 2002
 Mickey Mouse in Black and White
 The Complete Goofy
 Behind the Scenes at the Walt Disney Studio
Walt Disney Treasures: Wave Three — May 18, 2004
 Mickey Mouse in Living Color, Volume Two
 The Chronological Donald, Volume One
 On the Front Lines
 Tomorrow Land
Walt Disney Treasures: Wave Four — December 7, 2004
 Mickey Mouse in Black and White, Volume Two
 The Complete Pluto, Volume One
 The Mickey Mouse Club
Walt Disney Treasures: Wave Five — December 6, 2005
 The Chronological Donald, Volume Two
 Disney Rarities: Celebrated Shorts: 1920s–1960s
 The Adventures of Spin & Marty (The Mickey Mouse Club)
 Elfego Baca and The Swamp Fox: Legendary Heroes
Walt Disney Treasures: Wave Six — December 19, 2006
 More Silly Symphonies
 The Complete Pluto, Volume Two
 The Hardy Boys: The Mystery of The Applegate Treasure
 Your Host, Walt Disney
Walt Disney Treasures: Wave Seven — December 11, 2007
 The Chronological Donald, Volume Three
 The Adventures of Oswald the Lucky Rabbit
 Disneyland: Secrets, Stories and Magic
Walt Disney Treasures: Wave Eight — November 11, 2008
 The Chronological Donald, Volume Four
 Dr. Syn: The Scarecrow of Romney Marsh
 Mickey Mouse Club Presents: Annette
Walt Disney Treasures: Wave Nine — November 3, 2009
 Zorro: The Complete First Season
 Zorro: The Complete Second Season

Comic album line
In 2006, Gemstone Publishing published the first of two Walt Disney Treasures comic albums: Disney Comics: 75 Years of Innovation, reprinting approximately 160 pages of vintage international comics in chronological order. Much like the DVD releases, the comic album featured some politically incorrect stories in unedited form, accompanied by an article to put them in historical context. The comic album also featured a cover designed to look much like the DVD series' cases.

In 2008, Gemstone published the second Treasures comic album: Uncle Scrooge: A Little Something Special, featuring various Scrooge comics from over the years.

Two more Treasures comic albums were announced for 2009, with the titles: Mickey Mouse: In Death Valley and Donald Duck: 75 Unlucky Years. Due to the cessation of Gemstone's Disney comics license, these albums never came out in the Treasures series.

References

 
Disney direct-to-video films